Reticulomedusa is an extinct genus of prehistoric jellyfish within the family Rhizostomatidae containing a single species, Reticulomedusa greenei. It is known from the Mazon Creek located in Illinois.

References 

Fossil taxa described in 1979
Rhizostomatidae
Prehistoric cnidarian genera
Carboniferous cnidarians
Fossils of the United States